The 1907 TCU football team represented Texas Christian University (TCU) as an independent during the 1907 college football season. Led by Emory J. Hyde in his third and final year as head coach, TCU compiled a record of 4–2–2.

Schedule

References

TCU
TCU Horned Frogs football seasons
TCU football